Três Irmãos is a 1994 Portuguese drama film directed by Teresa Villaverde.

Cast
 Maria de Medeiros : Maria
 Marcello Urgeghe : Mário
 Evgeniy Sidikhin : João
 Laura del Sol : Teresa
 Mireille Perrier : the teacher 
 Olimpia Carlisi : the mother

Reception
Maria de Medeiros won the Volpi Cup for Best Actress at the 51st Venice International Film Festival.

References

External links
 

1994 films
Portuguese drama films
Films directed by Teresa Villaverde